On Truth and Lies in a Nonmoral Sense (also called On Truth and Lie in an Extra-Moral Sense) is a philosophical essay by Friedrich Nietzsche. It was written in 1873, one year after The Birth of Tragedy, but was published by his sister Elisabeth in 1896 when Nietzsche was already mentally ill.

Summary 
Nietzsche's essay provides an account for (and thereby a critique of) the contemporary considerations of truth and concepts. These considerations, argues Nietzsche, arose from the very establishment of a language:

According to Paul F. Glenn, Nietzsche is arguing that "concepts are metaphors which do not correspond to reality." Although all concepts are metaphors invented by humans (created by common agreement to facilitate ease of communication), writes Nietzsche, human beings forget this fact after inventing them, and come to believe that they are "true" and do correspond to reality. Thus Nietzsche argues that "truth" is actually:

These ideas about truth and its relation to human language have been particularly influential among postmodern theorists, and "On Truth and Lies in a Nonmoral Sense" is one of the works most responsible for Nietzsche's reputation (albeit a contentious one) as "the godfather of postmodernism."

Raymond Geuss has compared Nietzsche's view of language, as expressed in this essay, to be similar to that of the later Wittgenstein's, in its de-emphasis of "the distinction between literal and metaphorical usage."

See also 
 Beyond Good and Evil
 Deconstruction
 Herd Behavior
 On the Genealogy of Morality 
 "On the Use and Abuse of History for Life"
 Teleology in biology
 Truth

Notes

Further reading

External links 
 Original text in German
 On Truth and Lies in a Nonmoral Sense (English)
 On Truth and Lie in an Extra-Moral Sense (English)
Also: About Truth and lie in the extra-moral sense  (pages 119-128). In Nietzsche’s seven notebooks from 1876. New translation (2020) by Daniel Fidel Ferrer. Free online.

Books about metaphors
Essays by Friedrich Nietzsche